Anna Dorota Chrzanowska née von Fresen (fl. 1675), was a Polish heroine of the Polish–Ottoman War (1672–76), known for her acts during the Battle of Trembowla in 1675.

Act
She was married to Captain Jan Samuel Chrzanowski. In 1675, she was present with her spouse at his command position, Trembowla Castle, when it was besieged by the Ottoman Turks. Despite Turkish efforts, the defenders of castle managed to hold their positions after several attacks. After several days, shortages of food and water became severe, and Captain Chrzanowski decided to surrender. Chrzanowska disagreed with this decision, and threatened to commit suicide if he proceeded. She convinced him to hold the fort - furthermore, Anna Dorota urged the defenders to carry out an attack on Turkish positions, resulting in heavy losses among the Ottomans. Chrzanowska’s determination is regarded to have raised the morale among the Poles, despite the fact that their losses were also heavy. The Turks ended the siege on October 11. 

In 1676 Polish Sejm raised the Chrzanowski couple to become members of the szlachta (legally privileged noble class), with the right to use the Poraj coat of arms. They became famous celebrities.

Monument 

The first monument of Anna Dorota Chrzanowska erected in Trembowla in 1683 was last mentioned in 1829. Subsequently, in 1900, a second one was erected on  the same site, work of Terebovlian sculptor  J. Bohenek. It was destroyed in 1944 by Soviet troops. 
In 1982, the hill where monument once stood was rebuilt, and the slab was built, and the plate that remained undamaged was secured. On this spot opening of the third monument took place in July 2012, work of Roman Vilgushinsky.

Legacy
The siege of Trembowla and story of Anna Chrzanowska inspired Polish painters and writers alike.
Most notable works:
 Aleksander Lesser (1814–1884)  painting  Defense of the Trembowla against the Turks 
 Leopold Löffler  (1827–1898),  painting  Anna Dorota Chrzanowska at the castle in Trembowla 
 Józef Wybicki (1747–1822), drama
 Zofia Kossak-Szczucka (1889–1968), novel   Trembowla  
 Maria Krüger (1904–1999), story  Marcynka's bright braid  in the collection  Golden Crown  
 Andrzej Waligórski (1926–1992), poem  Song about the defense of Trembowla  which was performed by Tadeusz Chyłę (1933–2014).

References

17th-century Polish people
Women in 17th-century warfare
Polish women in war
17th-century Polish women